Gesonia mesoscota is a species of moth in the family Erebidae. It is found on the Bahamas.

References

Calpinae
Moths described in 1904
Moths of the Caribbean